Royal Air Force Matlaske or more simply RAF Matlaske is a former satellite station of the Royal Air Force to RAF Coltishall, situated near Matlaske in Norfolk, England.

History
There was a small aerodrome, details of which are not known, at Matlaske before the war started, then the site was approved for requisition by the Air Ministry in August 1939, with construction works beginning in the summer of 1940. RAF Matlaske became operational in October 1940 as a satellite station to RAF Coltishall when Spitfires of No. 72 Squadron were briefly dispersed there.

Luftwaffe attack 

On 29 October 1940 the Luftwaffe attacked the airfield at Matlaske. This attack followed the bombing of RAF Coltishall two days before which had necessitated the re-location of some of the Spitfires of 72 Squadron to Matlaske. Five Dornier aircraft carried out the attack, strafing the base and causing damage to parked aircraft as well as inflicting several casualties to personnel. On 12 May 1941 the Luftwaffe attacked the base again but this time they bombed using Incendiary bombs. The attack had limited success with only minor damage caused and no personnel casualties.

United States Army Air Force 
In September 1942, the airfield was allocated to the 8th United States Army Air Forces ostensibly for use as a fighter base by Republic P-47 Thunderbolts of the 56th Fighter Group from RAF Kings Cliffe but nothing is recorded of any use by that unit.

Royal Air Force 

From November 1941 to August 1942 the base was host to No. 137 Squadron, one of only two RAF squadrons to fly the unique twin-engine fighter, the Westland Whirlwind, when it was engaged on East coast convoy patrols and anti-shipping tasks. It was supported by the Air Sea Rescue squadron No. 278, Matlaske-based from October 1941 to April 1942.

Nos. 56, 195, 245, 266 and 609 Squadrons flying Hawker Typhoons, plus Nos. 19, 222, 229, 453, 602 and 611 Squadrons flying the Supermarine Spitfire, and No. 601 Squadron – the only one flying the Hawker Hurricane from here, were based or detached here at various times between October 1940 to April 1945.

From April to May 1943, No. 1489 Flight RAF conducted target towings with Hawker Henleys, Westland Lysanders, M.25 Martinets and M.9 Masters, which were based at RAF Coltishall and RAF Sutton Bridge and detached to Matlaske as required.

In August 1943, the airfield was transferred to Care and Maintenance and the facilities improved. Reopened in September 1944 it was used further by 3, 19, 56, 65, 122, 229, 451, 453, 485, 486 and 602 Squadrons at various times until April 1945, the RAF vacating the site in October 1945.

Units
The following Royal Air Force units served at Matlaske at one point or another during the Second World War:

Royal Air Force
 No. 3 Squadron RAF – Hawker Tempest V
 No. 19 Squadron RAF – Supermarine Spitfire II & Vb
 No. 56 Squadron RAF – Hawker Typhoon 1b, Tempest V
 No. 65 Squadron RAF – NA Mustang iii
 No. 72 Squadron RAF
 No. 122 Squadron RAF – NA Mustang III
 No. 137 Squadron RAF – Famous for its use of the Westland Whirlwind fighter
 No. 195 Squadron RAF – Hawker Typhoon 1b
 No. 222 Squadron RAF – Supermarine Spitfire II
 No. 229 Squadron RAF – Supermarine Spitfire IX
 No. 245 Squadron RAF – Hawker Typhoon 1b
 No. 266 Squadron RAF – Hawker Typhoon 1a
 No. 278 Squadron RAF – Westland Lysander IIIa, Supermarine Walrus II
 No. 486 Squadron RAF – Hawker Tempest V
 No. 601 Squadron RAF – Hawker Hurricane 2b
 No. 602 Squadron RAF – Supermarine Spitfire XVI
 No. 609 Squadron RAF – Hawker Typhoon 1b
 No. 611 Squadron RAF – Supermarine Spitfire IX & Vb
 No. 658 Squadron RAF
 No. 659 Squadron RAF
 No. 12 Group Target Towing Flight RAF
 No. 1489 (Fighter) Gunnery Flight RAF
 No. 1489 (Target Towing) Flight RAF
 No. 2738 Squadron RAF Regiment
 No. 2741 Squadron RAF Regiment
 No. 2765 Squadron RAF Regiment
 No. 2805 Squadron RAF Regiment
 No. 2811 Squadron RAF Regiment
 Air Sea Rescue Flight RAF, Matlaske (1941) became No. 278 Squadron RAF 
Royal Australian Air Force

No. 451 Squadron RAAF
No. 453 Squadron RAAF Supermarine Spitfire LFXVI

United States Army Air Forces
56th Fighter Group (allocated)

Aircraft
The following aircraft types served at the base:
Supermarine Spitfire
Hawker Henley
Hawker Hurricane
 Hawker Tempest
Hawker Typhoon
M.9 Master
M.25 Martinet
Bell P-39 Airacobra
Republic P-47 Thunderbolt
 North American Mustang III
Supermarine Walrus
Westland Lysander
Westland Whirlwind

References

Citations

Bibliography

Royal Air Force stations in Norfolk
Royal Air Force stations of World War II in the United Kingdom
World War II prisoner of war camps in England